Izeste is a commune in the Pyrénées-Atlantiques department and Nouvelle-Aquitaine region of south-western France.

Its inhabitants are called Isestois.

Notable people
 Théophile de Bordeu (born in Izeste in 1722; died in Bagnères-de-Bigorre in 1776, was a doctor to Louis XV and a character in Le Rêve de d'Alembert by Diderot.

See also
 Ossau Valley
 Communes of the Pyrénées-Atlantiques department

References

Communes of Pyrénées-Atlantiques